Ys is the second studio album by American musician Joanna Newsom. It was released by Drag City on November 14, 2006. The album was produced by Newsom and Van Dyke Parks, recorded by Steve Albini, mixed by Jim O'Rourke, with accompanying orchestral arrangements by Van Dyke Parks. It features guest vocals from Bill Callahan and Emily Newsom. The vocals and harp were recorded at The Village Recording Studio in Los Angeles in December 2005, with the orchestration being recorded between May and June 2006 at the Entourage Studios in Los Angeles.

The album consists of five tracks with song durations ranging from 7 to 17 minutes that deal with events and people who had been important in Newsom's life in the year previous to recording. These events include the sudden death of Newsom's best friend, a continuing illness and a tumultuous relationship. The album was named after the city of Ys, which according to myth was built on the coast of Brittany and later swallowed by the ocean. The album's title was the last element to be confirmed and was a result of a dream that Joanna had which featured the letters Y and S and a book recommended by a friend that contained reference to the myth. Newsom grew up near Yuba and Sutter counties in California, an area which is commonly abbreviated as “YS” for “Yuba-Sutter”, which may have additionally inspired the title.

Ys received acclaim. It was Newsom's first album to chart in the Billboard 200, where it peaked at number 134, and charted in the United Kingdom, France, Norway and Ireland. It has featured on several music publications' lists of the greatest albums.

Production
The album features full orchestra arrangements by Van Dyke Parks on four of the five tracks. Parks also contributes accordion. Newsom's harp and vocals were recorded by Steve Albini and the orchestra was recorded by Tim Boyle. Newsom and Parks produced the album and it was mixed by Jim O'Rourke. The recording process was completely analog, on two 24-track tape recorders. The music was mixed to tape and mastered at Abbey Road Studios.

Bass guitar is contributed by Lee Sklar, and electric guitar by jazz guitarist Grant Geissman. Don Heffington played percussion and Matt Cartsonis played mandolin and banjo. Bill Callahan provides backing vocals on the song "Only Skin", while on "Emily", these are sung by Joanna's sister, Emily Newsom, after whom the song is named.

The album, particularly the length of the songs and orchestral arrangements, was partially inspired by the 1971 Roy Harper album Stormcock. In September 2007, Harper supported Joanna Newsom at her Royal Albert Hall performance, playing Stormcock in its entirety. Newsom was also impressed by Van Dyke Parks' 1968 album Song Cycle, and asked him to collaborate on Ys after listening to that record.

On her fall 2007 tour, Newsom performed the album in its entirety, backed by a 29-piece orchestra.

Reception

Following its release in November 2006, Ys received widespread critical acclaim. At Metacritic, which assigns a normalized rating out of 100 to reviews from mainstream publications, the album received an average score of 85, indicating "universal acclaim". Chris Dahlen of Pitchfork called Ys "great because Newsom confronts a mountain of conflicting feelings, and sifts through them for every nuance". Describing it as "incredibly likeable, and more convivial than the twee Milk Eyed Mender", Jimmy Newlin of Slant Magazine dubbed Ys "a precious—in every sense of the word—masterpiece". Uncuts John Mulvey felt that though its "vast scale" opens up the potential for "self-indulgence" and "prog folly", upon listening to the record "all the doubts evaporate. Every elaboration has a purpose, every labyrinthine melodic detour feels necessary rather than contrived." Heather Phares of AllMusic described Ys as "a demanding listen, but it's also a rewarding and inspiring one", while Alexis Petridis of The Guardian concluded that the album is a "hard sell, perhaps, but it could be the best musical investment you make all year".

Pat Long of NME wrote that Newsom "has managed to lessen the twee factor of her last record, in the process crafting an album as bewitching as it is odd." Leah Greenblatt of Entertainment Weekly felt that Newsom "remains an acquired taste", but that Van Dyke Parks' contributions and the album's orchestration "have an ameliorating effect on the too-precious warble that either bewitches or repels." The Independents Andy Gill wrote that Ys "leaves one in no doubt of her oddball credentials" and "rarely, if ever, has an artist so assiduously cultivated cult status". Among negative assessments, Rolling Stone critic Christian Hoard called the album "hard to stomach" and plagued by overlong tracks "with meandering strings-and-things accompaniment and indulgent vocal quirks that make Björk sound like Kelly Clarkson." Robert Christgau, in his Consumer Guide column for MSN Music, wrote that much of the "sprightly" qualities of The Milk-Eyed Mender had been "subsumed here by ambition, to be kind, and privilege, to be brutally accurate", and that the album's songs "reveal only that her taste for the antique is out of control".

Ys became Newsom's first album to chart in the United States, peaking at number 134 on the Billboard 200. The album was later nominated for a 2007 Shortlist Music Prize. As of March 2010, Ys has sold more than 250,000 copies.

Legacy 
Ys has continued to garner critical attention in recent years. In 2016, several critics wrote articles in response to its 10th anniversary. Dubbing it Newsom's "greatest achievement", Drowned in Sounds Adam Turner-Heffer credited her and the album with proclaiming US indie music as "the dominant force" for the remainder of the 2000s. Noting that it "[stood] the test of time", he claimed that it improved when focusing on where indie and folk went in coming years. "A career-making masterpiece", Stereogums Chris DeVille praised Ys for establishing Newsom as "one of the greatest creative forces of her generation." He lauded her vocals' switching "between formalism and casual, folksy delivery", noting how it complimented her compositions. These aspects made the album "a rare instance of modern music with no real precedent." Vices Isobel Stone named Ys Newsom's "defining album", comparing it to what [The Beatles'] Sgt. Pepper's Lonely Hearts Club Band, [Bruce Springsteen's] Born in the U.S.A., and [Radiohead's] OK Computer were to their respective artists.

In 2016, Chance the Rapper referred to Ys as "one of my favorite albums of all time". Frances Quinlan, who fronts indie rock quartet Hop Along, dubbed it "by far one of the affecting albums of my life" and Newsom as influential to them. Strand of Oaks' Timothy Showalter expressed his admiration of the album and Newsom's lyrical gifts, writing that she "stands at some grander place than me, and I am deeply reassured by that."

Accolades
By the end of 2006 Ys appeared in more than 50 year-end lists, placing inside the top 10 in 35 of them, including a #1 ranking in Tiny Mix Tapes' Top 25 Albums of 2006, and CHARTbeat's Top 100 Albums of 2006  a #3 ranking on Pitchforks Top 50 Albums of 2006, and a #7 ranking Time magazine's 10 Best Albums of 2006. Despite a negative review by the US Rolling Stone, the German version of the magazine named the album the second greatest of the year. According to Acclaimedmusic.net Ys is the third best album of 2006, and the 27th greatest record released that decade and the 271st greatest of all-time. The album was also included in the book 1001 Albums You Must Hear Before You Die.

In 2009, the album started to appear in many "best of the decade" lists. Pitchfork named Ys the 83rd greatest album of the 2000s. Calling Newsom "unlike anyone else" aside calling the album "the most artistically ambitious indie rock enterprise of the decade" Ys is one of two Joanna Newsom albums placed inside the top 100, the other being The Milk-Eyed Mender. UK magazine Uncut placed the album inside their "150 greatest album of the decade" list, at number 21. Gigwise named Ys the 32nd greatest album of the 2000s commenting that "the record rightly received blanket acclaim upon its initial release and is already sounding better with age. Whether she'll ever top this new-folk masterpiece remains to be seen." The Times placed the album at number 26 in their top 100 albums of the decade list, while The Guardian named it one of the '1000 Albums To Hear Before You Die'. British magazine Clash placed Ys at number 13 in their '50 Greatest Albums Of Our Lifetime' list. German magazine Musikexpress named Ys the 92nd greatest album of the last four decades (1969–2009). Two Spanish magazines, Playground and Rock de Lux, have respectively named Ys their 83rd and 15th greatest album of the 2000s. About placed Ys  at number one inside their greatest album of the decade list. In 2010, Tiny Mix Tapes named the album the 18th greatest of the 2000s and Cokemachineglow.com the 81st. Rhapsody named it the 46th best album of the 2000s (decade).

In 2020, Daniel Radcliffe selected the song "Emily" as one of his choices for the BBC Radio 4 program Desert Island Discs, describing Newsom as an artist "who gets weirder and more wonderful and more imaginative every time she comes back."

End of year

#1 – Blow Up's Top Albums of 2006
#1 – Drowned in Sound's Top Ten Albums of 2006
#1 – emusic's Top Albums of 2006
#1 – Lost At Sea's Top Albums of 2006
#1 – Plattentests's Top Albums of 2006
#1 – Rock de Lux's Top Albums of 2006
#1 – Sound Generator's Top Albums of 2006
#1 – Tiny Mix Tapes's Favorite Albums of 2006
#2 – B92 Net Radio's Top Albums of 2006
#2 – No Ripcord's Top Albums of 2006
#2 – Rockerilla's Top Albums of 2006
#2 – Rolling Stone Germany's Top Albums of 2006
#3 – Dagsavisens Top Albums of 2006
#3 – Daily California's Top Albums of 2006
#3 – Mucchio Selvaggio's Top Albums of 2006
#3 – Ondarock's Top Albums of 2006
#3 – Pitchforks Top 50 Albums of 2006
#3 – Screenagers's Top Albums of 2006
#3 – The Wire's Records of 2006
#4 – Dagbladets Top Albums of 2006
#4 – Dusted Magazines Favorite Albums of 2006
#4 – HARP's Top Albums of 2006
#4 – Heaven's Top Albums of 2006
#4 – Les Choses's Top Albums of 2006
#4 – Spex's Top Albums of 2006
#4 – Stereogum's 2006 Gummy Awards
#4 – Uncut's Definitive Albums of 2006
#5 – Idolator's 2006 Jackin' Pop Critics Poll
#5 – Prefix Magazines Top Albums of 2006
#6 – Spin's 40 Best Albums of 2006
#6 – The Village Voices 2006 Pazz & Jop Critics Poll
#7 – Baltimore City Papers Top Albums of 2006
#7 – BOOMKAT's Top Albums of 2006
#7 – Musikexpress's Top Albums of 2006
#7 – The Observers Best Albums of 2006
#7 – Time's 10 Best Albums of 2006
#8 – The Austin Chronicles 2006 in Albums
#8 – MusicOMH's Top Albums of 2006
#8 – PopMatters's Best Albums of 2006
#8 – Treble's Top Albums of 2006
#9 – Delusions of Adequacy's Top 10 Albums of 2006
#9 – Monitor's Top Albums of 2006
#10 – Stylus Magazine's Top 50 Albums of 2006
#12 – Cokemachineglow's Top Albums of 2006
#13 – Gaffa's Top Albums of 2006
#14 – Eye Weeklys Top Albums of 2006
#14 – Super 45's Top Albums of 2006
#15 – Playlouder's Top Albums of 2006
#16 – Hissing's Top Albums of 2006
#17 – Popnews's Top Albums of 2006
#17 – Refinery29's Top Albums of 2006
#20 – Mojo's Top Albums of 2006
#23 – Mondo Sonoro's Top Albums of 2006
#24 – Sonic's Top Albums of 2006
#24 – OORs Top Albums of 2006
#25 – Les Inrockuptibless Top Albums of 2006
 No Order – Allmusic's Top Albums of 2006
 No Order – BBC's Top Albums of 2006
 No Order – Glide's Top Albums of 2006
 No Order – Sentire Ascoltare's Top Albums of 2006
 Nominee – Shortlist Prize's Top Albums of 2006

End of decade
#1 – About.com's Top 100 Albums of the 2000s
#15 – Rock de Lux's Top 100 Albums
#18 – Tiny Mix Tapes's Favorite 100 Albums of 2000–2009
#21 – Uncut's 150 Greatest Albums of the Decade
#26 – The Timess 100 Best Albums of the Noughties
#32 – Gigwise's 50 Greatest Albums of the 2000s
#83 – Pitchforks Top 200 Albums of the 2000s
#83 – Playground's Top 200 Albums

Other
#13 – Clash Magazine's 50 Greatest Albums of Our Lifetime
#22 – The Guardians The 100 Best Albums of the 21st Century
#92 – Musikexpress's The 100 Best Albums 1969–2009
 #141 – NPRs 2017 List: “Turning The Tables: The 150 Greatest Albums by Women”
 No Order – Hervé Bourhis's 555 Records
 Special Mention – The Guardian''s 1000 Albums to Hear Before You Die

Track listing

Personnel

Musicians
Joanna Newsom – harp, leader, vocals, pedal harp
Lee Sklar – electric bass
Grant Geissman – electric guitar
Don Heffington – percussion
Matt Cartsonis – banjo, mandolin
Van Dyke Parks – accordion
Terry Schonig – marimba, cymbalom
Bill Callahan – vocal harmonies
Emily Newsom – vocal harmonies

Production
Steve Albini – engineer
Tim Boyle – engineer
TJ Doherty – mixing assistant
Richard Good – design
Joanna Newsom – producer
Jim O'Rourke – mixing, mixing engineer
Van Dyke Parks – producer, conductor, orchestral arrangements
John Rosenberg – conductor
William T. Stromberg – copy
Benjamin A. Vierling – paintings
Nick Webb – mastering

Orchestra

Peter Kent – violin, concertmaster
Francine Walsh – violin
Shari Zippert – violin
Sharon Jackson – violin
Julie Rogers – violin
Gina Kronstadt – violin
John Wittenberg – violin
Cameron Patrick – violin
Larry Greenfield – violin
Adriana Zoppo – violin
Vladimir Polimatidi – violin
Edmund Stein – violin
David Stenske – viola
Briana Bandy – viola
Caroline Buckman – viola
Jessica Van Velzen – viola
Marda Todd – viola
Karen Elaine – viola
Miriam Mayer – viola
Erika Duke-Kirkpatrick – cello
Giovna Clayton – cello
David Stone – bass
Bart Samolis – bass
Peter Doubrovsky – bass
Peter Nevin – clarinet
Jeff Driskill – clarinet
Susan Greenberg – flute
Patricia Cloud – flute
Phillip Feather – oboe
John Mitchell – bassoon
Robert O'Donnell – trumpet
Steven Durnin – French horn

Charts

References

2006 albums
Joanna Newsom albums
New Weird America albums
Drag City (record label) albums
Folk baroque albums
Albums produced by Van Dyke Parks